HECA may refer to:

Higher Education Colleges Association, a representative body of independent third level colleges in Ireland
Hospital de Emergencias Clemente Álvarez, an emergency hospital and trauma center in Rosario, Argentina
Hydrogen Energy California, a defunct alternative energy, hydrogen power project
HECA, the ICAO code for Cairo International Airport, Egypt